Bozhidar Ivanov can refer to:

 Bozhidar Ivanov (boxer) (born 1956), a Bulgarian Olympic boxer
 Bozhidar Ivanov (gymnast) (born 1943), a Bulgarian Olympic gymnast